Cutler River may refer to a waterway in the United States:

Cutler River (Alaska)
Cutler River (New Hampshire)